Jutta Irmscher is a skydiver, who competed for the SC Dynamo Hoppegarten / Sportvereinigung (SV) Dynamo. In 1965, she was one of three members of the group that came third in the team accuracy landing (Gruppenzielspringen) category of the East German women's skydiving championships.

References 

East German skydivers
Living people
Year of birth missing (living people)